Brana Bajic is a Bosnian television actress. She has appeared in The Bill, Randall and Hopkirk and Trial and Retribution.  Her most recent role was as Marta in The Bletchley Circle. Her husband is the actor David Threlfall.

Filmography
The Bletchley Circle (2014) (TV)
Silent Witness (2013) (TV) as Dr Fawzia (episode: "Greater Love")
New Tricks (2012) (TV)
All the Small Things (2009) (TV)
Casualty (2008) (TV)
Apparitions (2008) (TV)
Shameless (2005) (TV)
Trial & Retribution VIII (2004) (TV)
A Line in the Sand (2004) (TV)
The Bill (2003) (TV)
Stranded (2002) (TV)
Randall and Hopkirk (2001) (TV)
In the Beginning (2000) (TV)
CI5: The New Professionals (1999) (TV)
Food for Ravens (1997) (TV)
Bugs (1995) (TV)
The Chief (1994) (TV)
Anna Lee (1994) (TV)

References

External links
 

British actresses
Living people
Year of birth missing (living people)
Bosnia and Herzegovina emigrants to England
20th-century Bosnia and Herzegovina actresses
21st-century Bosnia and Herzegovina actresses
Bosnia and Herzegovina television actresses
Actresses from Sarajevo
Bosnia and Herzegovina expatriates in England